Tracy Reiner ( Henry) is an American actress.  She is known for her roles in When Harry Met Sally..., Masque of the Red Death, A League of Their Own, and Apollo 13.

Early life 
Reiner was born Tracy Henry in Albuquerque, New Mexico, the daughter of actress and director Penny Marshall and Michael Henry. She is filmmaker Garry Marshall's niece.  Her mother was married for 10 years to Rob Reiner, who adopted her and raised her as his own.  Her mother was of Italian, English, German, and Scottish descent.  Reiner's adoptive paternal grandparents are actor and comedian Carl Reiner (1922–2020) and actress Estelle Reiner (1914–2008).  Growing up, 15 of Reiner's relatives were employed at labs run by the United States Atomic Energy Commission.

Career 
Reiner  starred in the 1989 film Masque of the Red Death in the role of Lucretia. She has appeared in nearly 30 films, among them Jumpin' Jack Flash (1986), Die Hard (1988), When Harry Met Sally... (1989), A League of Their Own (1992), and Apollo 13 (1995).

She was associate producer of the documentary Children of the Revolution: Tune Back In (2005).

In 2013, Reiner headed a team to fund and market medical software.

Filmography

Film

Television

References

Further reading

External links 
 

1964 births
Living people
20th-century American actresses
21st-century American actresses
Actresses from Albuquerque, New Mexico
Actresses from New Mexico
American film actresses
American film producers
American documentary film producers
American adoptees
American women documentary filmmakers
Reiner family